Gold plating is the act of depositing a thin layer of gold on the surface of other metals in the modern electronics industry

Gold plating may also refer to:

 Gilding, various traditional methods of depositing a thin layer of gold on the surface of other materials in goldsmithing, jewellery, furniture etc.
 Gold-plating (European Union law), the practise of national bodies exceeding the terms of European Union directives when implementing them into national law
 Gold plating (project management), the act of adding unneeded enhancements to a product or service to inflate the final cost to its buyer and the associated profit realized by its producer
 The Averch-Johnson effect, the tendency of regulated companies to engage in excessive amounts of capital accumulation in order to expand the volume of their profits, colloquially referred to as gold plating